Wymondham is a town in Norfolk, England.

Wymondham may also refer to:

 Wymondham, Leicestershire, England
 Wymondham College, Norfolk, England
 Wymondham railway station, Norfolk, England
 Wymondham Town F.C., Norfolk, England